The 1983 Seiko Hong Kong Classic, also known as the Hong Kong Open, was a men's tennis tournament played on outdoor hard courts in Hong Kong that was part of the 1983 Grand Prix tennis circuit. It was the 11th edition of the event and was held from 31 October through 6 November 1983. Unseeded Wally Masur won the singles title.

Finals

Singles
 Wally Masur defeated  Sammy Giammalva 6–1, 6–1
 It was Masur's first singles title of his career.

Doubles
 Drew Gitlin /  Craig Miller defeated  Sammy Giammalva /  Steve Meister 6–2, 6–2

References

External links
 ITF tournament edition details

Viceroy Classic
1983 in Hong Kong
Tennis in Hong Kong